Paul Adam Belk (born 12 June 1977) is a British former competitive swimmer who swam in the 2000 Summer Olympics in Sydney, Australia.  Belk competed for the British men's team in the preliminary heats of the 4x100-metre freestyle relay.

Immediately prior to the 2000 Olympics, Belk swam in the 2000 FINA Short Course World Championships in Athens, winning a bronze medal in the 4x100-metre freestyle relay.  The following year as the 2001 World University Games in Beijing, he was a member of the first-place British team in the men's 4x100-metre freestyle relay.

References

1977 births
Living people
British male swimmers
British male freestyle swimmers
Olympic swimmers of Great Britain
Swimmers at the 2000 Summer Olympics
Universiade medalists in swimming
Universiade gold medalists for Great Britain
Medalists at the 2001 Summer Universiade